The secretary of state of Rhode Island is an elected office in the U.S. state of Rhode Island.  As of 2023, the current secretary of state is Gregg Amore.

Powers and duties 
The Rhode Island Department of State or is composed of five separate divisions:
The Elections and Civics Division prepares ballots, ensures accessibility of voting facilities, qualifies and certifies the names of all federal and state candidates for ballot placement, maintains a database of registered voters, and ensures compliance with the Help America Vote Act.  Administration of elections and compliance with campaign finance laws is the responsibility of a separate state agency, the Rhode Island Board of Elections.
The Corporations Division is responsible for a wide range of business-related legal documents and filings, including formation of corporations and other business entities, liens and security interests under the Uniform Commercial Code, registration of notaries public, apostilles, trademarks and service marks, registration of businesses conducting games of chance, and various other documents required by state law.
The Public Information Division accepts many filings required to be made with the secretary of state, including lobbying disclosures, public meeting notices and minutes, disclosure of state government consultants, and appointments to boards and commissions, and other government information.  This division also publishes the Rhode Island Government Owner's Manual, which gives a broad overview of various government offices and officials.
The Rhode Island State Archives is the official custodian and trustee for public records of permanent historical value.
The Rhode Island State Library, which was created in 1852 by a General Assembly resolution as part of the office of the secretary of state.  Its purpose is to assist members of the General Assembly with research on the preparation of proposed legislation.  The State Library also includes a law library.

List of Secretaries of state

See also
 Attorney General of Rhode Island

References

External links
Secretary of State Incorporations (Non Business) finding aid from the Rhode Island State Archives
Letter from P.T. Barnum to the R.I. Secretary of State from the Rhode Island State Archives

 
Secretary of state